The Breda Ba.88 Lince ("Lynx") was a ground-attack aircraft used by the Italian Regia Aeronautica during World War II. Its streamlined design and retractable undercarriage were advanced for the time, and after its debut in 1937 the aircraft established several world speed records. However, when military equipment was installed on production examples, problems of instability developed and the aeroplane's general performance deteriorated. Eventually its operational career was cut short, and the remaining Ba.88 airframes were used as fixed installations on airfields to mislead enemy reconnaissance. It represented, perhaps, the most remarkable failure of any operational aircraft to see service in World War II.

Design and development
It first flew in October 1936. The project was derived from the aborted Ba.75 also designed by Giuseppe Panzeri and Antonio Parano.

Technical description
The Ba.88 was an all-metal, twin-engine, two-crew monoplane, with a high-mounted wing. It employed a "concentric" fuselage design, with a framework of steel tubes and a metallic skin covering which was both streamlined (having a very small fuselage cross-section) and strong. However, this internal load-bearing structure was very complex and of outdated design, as monocoque designs were starting to be developed elsewhere. The internal struts resulted in excessive weight compounded by manufacturing delays. The narrow confines of the fuselage would require the Ba.88 to carry bombs in a semi-external structure - to the detriment of the aircraft's aerodynamics. The all-metal wings had two longerons, and housed the engine nacelles, undercarriage main elements, and the majority of the 12 self-sealing fuel tanks (the only protection in the aircraft), providing 1,586 L (419 US gal) total capacity. All three undercarriage units were retractable, which was unusual for the time.

The aircraft was powered by two Piaggio P.XI air-cooled radial engines. They were of the same type as used in other projects such as the Re.2000, and drove two three-blade, constant-speed 3.2 m (10.4 ft) diameter Breda propellers. The engine nacelles also carried the two main undercarriage units. The aircraft had a twin tail to provide the dorsal 7.7 mm (0.303 in) Breda-SAFAT machine gun with a better field of fire.

The aircraft had three nose-mounted 12.7 mm (0.5 in) Breda-SAFAT machine guns with 400, 450 and 400 rounds of ammunition respectively. A 7.7 mm (0.303 in) Breda machine gun (with 250-500 rounds) with a high arc of fire, was fitted in the rear cockpit and controlled by a complex motorised electrical system. A modern "San Giorgio" reflector gunsight was fitted, and there was also provision to mount a 20 mm cannon instead of the central machine gun in the nose. Together these weapons gave the Ba.88 impressive armament for its time.

Testing and evaluation
Despite its structural weight liabilities, the single-tailed prototype set a speed record over a  circuit on 1 April 1937 by reaching , taking the record away from France. Piloted by Furio Niclot Doglio, the Ba.88 prototype had two  Isotta Fraschini K 14 engines. This record speed was increased to  when the modified prototype, using a double tail, was re-equipped with the definitive engines; the  Piaggio P.XI-RC40s.

The Ba.88 had all the design specifications to be a very effective heavy fighter-bomber. It had a slim, streamlined shape (noted by all aviation observers), a rugged structure, heavy firepower, long range and high speed, with the same horsepower of medium bombers such as the Br.20 (but at 9 tonnes/10 tons vs. 5 tonnes/6 tons). Despite its promising beginning, the addition of military equipment in the production series aircraft resulted in high wing loading and detrimental aerodynamic effects with a corresponding loss of performance, below any reasonable level. The contract was subsequently canceled, but production was later resumed, mostly for political reasons to avoid closing production lines of Breda and its satellite company IMAM.

Production
Production numbers of the first series (production started in 1939) were 81 machines (MM 3962–4042) made by Breda, and 24 by IMAM (MM 4594–4617). The first series included eight trainers, with an elevated second pilot's seat. This was one of the few combat aircraft to have a dedicated trainer version, but it was not enough to prevent the overall failure of the programme.

The second series totalled 19 Breda (4246-4264) and 24 IMAM (MM:5486-5509) machines fitted with small engine cowling rings. There was a limited evolution in this series, with the second series mainly being sent straight to the scrapyard.

Operational history

Two Gruppi (Groups) were equipped with the Breda Ba.88 in June 1940, operating initially from Sardinia against the main airfield of Corsica, with 12 aircraft on 16 June 1940 and three on 19 June 1940. The crews soon found that the Bredas were extremely underpowered and lacked agility, but the lack of fighter opposition resulted in them being able to perform their missions without losses.

Later, 64 aircraft became operational serving 7º Gruppo in the North African Theatre with 19º Gruppo stationed in Sardinia, but their performance remained extremely poor resulting in 7º Gruppo being grounded from the end of June until September, when the Italian offensive against British forces started. Of three aircraft used, one was not even capable of taking off, and another could not turn and was forced to fly straight from their base at Castelvetrano to Sidi Rezegh.

With anti-sand filters fitted, a maximum level speed of 250 km/h (155 mph) was reported in some cases and several units were even unable to take off at all. These machines were fitted with "Spezzoniera" Nardi dispensers with 119 2 kg (4 lb) bomblets, 1,000 rounds for the three 12.7 mm (0.5 in) machine guns and 500 rounds for the 7.7 mm (0.303 in) Bredas. Although the weapons were not loaded to full capacity and the aircraft was lightened by eliminating the rear machine gun, observer, bombs and some fuel, lessening the weight did not substantially affect the aircraft's performance.

By mid-November, just five months after the start of the war on 10 June 1940, most surviving Ba.88s had been phased out as bombers and stripped of useful equipment, and were scattered around operational airfields as decoys for attacking aircraft. This was a degrading end for the new and theoretically powerful aircraft. It forced the Regia Aeronautica to use totally outdated aircraft in North Africa, such as the Breda Ba.65 and Fiat C.R.32. As an additional problem, the Regia Aereonautica remained without any suitable heavy fighter, a notable weakness for a major air arm.

Similar "heavy fighter-destroyer" projects were developed in several countries. In France, the Breguet Br.690 even with only  was more capable than the Ba.88. Despite some problems of reliability, the Br.690 showed a practical usefulness that the Breda never achieved. The Ba.88 was also a contemporary of the Messerschmitt Bf 110, with no great differences in horsepower, weight, power to weight ratio or wingload but the difference in success was immensely in the Bf 110's favour.

Niclot was the only pilot capable of flying this machine at its best and only in the racer version which was much lighter, while the average pilot was not capable of using it effectively. Despite its impressive world records and aggressive, slim shape, the Ba.88 was a failure and unable to undertake combat missions. Its structure was too heavy, wing loading too high, and the engines were quite unreliable with insufficient power. The Piaggio P.XI was quite powerful, but never reliable, leading also to the overall failure of the Reggiane Re.2000. Hungary substituted the engines with similar ones for the first license-produced examples.

Three Ba.88s were modified by the Agusta plant in late 1942 to serve as ground-attack aircraft. The Ba.88M had the wingspan increased by 2 meters (6 ft 6½ in) to alleviate wing-loading problems, and featured dive brakes, Fiat A.74 RC.38 engines, and a nose armament increased to four 12.7 mm (0.5 in) Breda-SAFAT machine guns. Evaluated at Guidonia, they were delivered to the 103° Gruppo Autonomo Tuffatori at Lonate Pozzolo on 7 September 1943, the day before Italian Armistice. Later they were evaluated by Luftwaffe pilots and that was the last heard of the aircraft.

Variants
 Ba.88 Lince
 The production ground attack and reconnaissance aircraft.
 Ba.88M
 Three aircraft modified as dedicated ground-attack aircraft with Fiat A.74 engines increased wing-span and dive brakes.

Operators
  Kingdom of Italy
 Regia Aeronautica

Specifications (Ba.88)

See also

References

Notes

Bibliography
 Angelucci, Enzo and Paolo Matricardi. World Aircraft: World War II, Volume I (Sampson Low Guides). Maidenhead, UK: Sampson Low, 1978.
 Donald, David, ed. "Breda Ba.88." The Encyclopedia of World Aircraft. Etobicoke, Ontario, Canada: Prospero Books, 1997. .
 Lembo, Daniele. "Breda 88 Lince. (in Italian)" Aerei Nella Storia n.44 October 2005. Parma, Italy: West-ward Edizioni.
 Mondey, David. The Hamlyn Concise Guide to Axis Aircraft of World War II. London: Bounty Books, 2006. .

Ba.088
1930s Italian attack aircraft
World War II Italian ground attack aircraft
High-wing aircraft
Aircraft first flown in 1936
Twin piston-engined tractor aircraft